Don Carlos Smith (March 25, 1816 – August 7, 1841) was the youngest brother of Joseph Smith and a leader, missionary, and periodical editor in the early days of the Latter Day Saint movement.

Smith was born in Norwich, Vermont, on March 25, 1816, the seventh son of Joseph Smith Sr. and Lucy Mack Smith. As an adolescent, Smith was an early convert to the Church of Christ that was established by his brother Joseph in 1830. Don Carlos was baptized on June 9 of that year in Seneca Lake.

Smith was the first editor of the Nauvoo, Illinois-based Latter Day Saint newspaper Times and Seasons, beginning in June of 1839 after he and his colleague, Ebenezer Robinson, were commissioned by a council of leaders of the Church of Jesus Christ of Latter Day Saints to publish. He edited a total of 31 editions of the Times and Seasons from 1839 to 1841. As a printer and editor, Smith was involved in the printing of the 1835 edition of the Doctrine and Covenants, several editions of the Book of Mormon, and also served as the publisher and editor for the short-lived periodical Elders' Journal. Smith also participated in printing the monthly editions of the Messenger and Advocate newspaper. He was also active as an early missionary of the Latter Day Saint church. At the age of fourteen, Smith was the youngest missionary for the church, serving with his father, Joseph Smith Sr., in the Eastern States mission from August through September 1830. When he was nineteen, he served again in the Eastern States mission (in the year 1836). Smith served his last mission at age 22 in the Southern States mission, from September 26, 1838, until December 25, 1838. Smith participated in the ceremony of the laying of the cornerstones of the Kirtland Temple, and he was a member of the temple's construction crew. He married Agnes Moulton Coolbrith on July 30, 1835, with whom he had three daughters.  

On January 15, 1836, Smith was selected as the first president of the high priests quorum of the church, a position that is today referred to as a stake president. He represented the high priests of the church when the cornerstones were laid to the Nauvoo Temple in early 1841. Smith also served on the Nauvoo City Council. He was brigadier general of the Nauvoo Legion and a regent at the University of Nauvoo.

Smith died in Nauvoo, Illinois, on August 7, 1841 of pneumonia. He was buried at the Smith Family Cemetery."Don Carlos Smith", findagrave.com. He was survived by his wife Agnes Moulton Coolbrith, who later became a plural wife of Joseph Smith. Don Carlos Smith was the father of Ina Coolbrith, who became the first poet laureate of California.

See also
Robert B. Thompson

Notes

External links
 Roger D. Launius, Don Carlos Smith: Brother of the Prophet 

1816 births
1841 deaths
American Latter Day Saint leaders
American Latter Day Saint missionaries
Burials at the Smith Family Cemetery
Converts to Mormonism
Deaths from pneumonia in Illinois
Doctrine and Covenants people
Editors of Latter Day Saint publications
Latter Day Saint missionaries in the United States
Leaders in the Church of Christ (Latter Day Saints)
People from Norwich, Vermont
People from Ontario County, New York
Religious leaders from New York (state)
Religious leaders from Vermont
Smith family (Latter Day Saints)
Harold B. Lee Library-related 19th century articles